Trinity Tower is a skyscraper situated at the intersection of H.R. Rasuna Said Road and Jl. Prof. Dr. Satrio Road in Jakarta, Indonesia. The building was known as the Daswin building during its construction period. It was developed by PT Windas Development, which consists of Japan-based real estate giant Mitsubishi Estate, Indonesian manufacturing company and property developer Gesit Group and diversified conglomerate Santini Group. The project was the first opportunity for Mitsubishi Estate to develop an office building in Indonesia.

Built with earthquake resistant technology and a green building concept, the tower is constructed on a land area of 1.6 hectares.

See also

List of tallest buildings in Indonesia
List of tallest buildings in Jakarta

References

Towers in Indonesia
Buildings and structures in Jakarta
Skyscrapers in Indonesia
Post-independence architecture of Indonesia
Skyscraper office buildings in Indonesia